The Puerto Rican worm snake (Typhlops rostellatus) is a species of snake in the Typhlopidae family.

See also

List of amphibians and reptiles of Puerto Rico
Fauna of Puerto Rico
List of endemic fauna of Puerto Rico

References

Typhlops
Reptiles described in 1904
Snakes of the Caribbean
Reptiles of Puerto Rico
Endemic fauna of Puerto Rico